is a Japanese artist management and record company, which is a subsidiary of Tom Yoda's TY Limited Group and was founded on July 7, 2003. It is located at 4-6 Sarugakuchō, Ebisu-Ōmukai, Shibuya, Tokyo.

It also co-owns Sistus Records with NBCUniversal Entertainment Japan.

Artists
 TiA (Pony Canyon)
 Jyukai (band) (UMJ/Geneon)
 Manami Watanabe (UMJ/Geneon)
 Sachi Tainaka (UMJ/Geneon)
 Younha (UMJ/Geneon)
 Depapepe (SMEJ)
 I-dep
 Yacht. (SMEJ)
 Amadori
 Keigo Iwase
 Jackson Vibe (Avex)
 Sotte Bosse (UMJ)
 Nice Hashimoto (JVC)
 Minji (Dreamusic)
 Limelight (SMEJ)
 Zentaro Watanabe (Toy's Factory)
 Cargo
 手裏剣ジェット
 Takachiya (SMEJ)
 Soundland
 Youhei Oomori (SMEJ)
 Ayaka Ikio
 Chix Chicks
 cune
 Vasallo Crab 75
 Vish
 Doia Kane
 Viola
 Fusik
 Note Native
 DJ Kanbe
 Sinsuke Fujieda Group
 Language
 ウリフターズ
 Tate
 Beat Nature
 0 Soul 7
 GRiP
 Lucky13
 Super Beaver
 Botchan
 1000 Say
 SteAd
 SG Honeoka
 Kids Alike
 50oldman
 The Baby Leaf
 Scarlet
 Four the MG
 Ephonoscope
 Setsuna Bluestar
 Green Ground Asia
 2HT
 Laughlife
 Full Language
 Sidekick 9
 amazarashi (SMEJ)
 DJ Sarasa
 Mary
 r.a.m.
 The Unique Star

Labels
 AZ Tribe
 bloom
 EChords
 Joy Rider
 Junkfood
 Knock Up!- joint venture with Tower Records Japan
 rebelphonic
 Sasso

See also
 Tom Yoda

References

External links
 Rainbow Entertainment

Japanese talent agencies
Japanese record labels
Record labels established in 2003